Distocyclus conirostris is a species of glass knifefishes found in the deep waters (3.8-28.3 m) of the Amazon basin, lower portions of the Potaro River and in major parts of the Rio Orinoco. They are typically relegated to flood basins, flooded forests and main river channels. They have been found often when gathering in small groups around vegetation, indicating a social nature. The fish has semi-translucent, glass-like pectoral and anal fins. The main body is a ground-like color with a lighter head. The largest currently recorded specimen is 34.5 cm (9.65 inches).

Ecology 
Distocyclus conirostris has a tapering, conical snout with the top and bottom jaws being equal in length. The mouth is located terminally. The eyes are located on either side of a bilaterally compressed, elongated body and are covered by a nictitating membrane. The snout contains a uniquely small nasal capsule for the family Sternopygidae. The mouth of Distocyclus conirostris contains a single row of teeth located on the anterior area of the dentary bone, a trait also unique to this species in comparison to the other members of the Sternopygidae.

The fish is covered in cycloid scales and typically has 4 to 5 gills with 4 to 11 small gill rakers. The body lacks any dark bands running laterally down the body, something present in Japigny kirschbaum, another species of the Sternopygidae. The fish also typically has 13-14 precaudal vertebrae, differing significantly from the 20-26 precaudal vertebrae present in the Sternopygus genus.

Distocyclus goajira, a potential sister fish of Distocyclus conirostris, is currently a subject of debate in regards to its phylogenetic position and relationship within either the Distocyclus genus or the Sternopygidae family.

Behavior 
Distocyclus conirostris are social fishes who communicate through the use of chirps and modulation of said chirps. These chirps are created by the fish's electric organ, which releases chirps of varying frequencies dependent on social context. It is currently unknown whether or not Jamming Avoidance Response (JAR) is utilized when encountering other weakly electric knifefish in order to decrease interference between their electrolocation accuracy and their electrocommunication usage. It is unknown whether these chirps are sexually dimorphic or whether they vary individually.

Reproduction 
There is little information on specific reproduction of Distocyclus conirostris currently and it is unknown if their use of chirping for communicative purposes is uniquely modulated during spawning season or to reproductive means.

Conservation 
Distocyclus conirostris is considered to be of Least Concern by an IUCN 3.1 assessment conducted in 2009.

References

Sternopygidae
Fish of Brazil
Endemic fauna of Brazil
Taxa named by Carl H. Eigenmann
Taxa named by William Ray Allen
Fish described in 1942
Wikipedia Student Program